= Muslim Dhagi =

Dhagi
Regions with significant populations
- India

Religion
- Islam

The Muslim Dhagi are a Muslim community found in the state of Uttar Pradesh in India. They were also known as the Julahas.
